Sharvol is a rural locality (a settlement) in Oshibskoye Rural Settlement, Kudymkarsky District, Perm Krai, Russia. The population was 19 as of 2010.

Geography 
Sharvol is located 57 km northeast of Kudymkar (the district's administrative centre) by road. Savina is the nearest rural locality.

References 

Rural localities in Kudymkarsky District